Vasyshcheve is an urban-type settlement in Kharkiv Raion of Kharkiv Oblast in Ukraine. It lies on the banks of the Studenok where it joins the Udy, in the drainage basin of the Don. Vasyshcheve belongs to Bezliudivka settlement hromada, one of the hromadas of Ukraine. Population:

Economy

Transportation
The closest railway station, Ternove, is on the railway connecting Kharkiv and Kupiansk-Vuzlovyi. There is infrequent passenger traffic.

The settlement has access to Kharkiv Ring Road, and eventually to the road network of the city of Kharkiv.

References

Urban-type settlements in Kharkiv Raion